Salvatore Di Vittorio (born 22 October 1967 in Palermo) is an Italian composer and conductor. He is music director and Conductor of the Chamber Orchestra of New York. He has been recognized by Luigi Verdi (Philharmonic Academy of Bologna) as a "lyrical musical spirit, respectful of the ancient Italian tradition… an emerging leading interpreter of the music of Ottorino Respighi".

Biography
He began music studies with his father Giuseppe in Italy, then studied composition with the late Ludmila Ulehla and Giampaolo Bracali at the Manhattan School of Music in the U.S., and conducting with Giampaolo Bracali, Francesco Carotenuto, and the late Piero Bellugi in Italy, who later praised his conducting style - "follows the tradition of the Italian schools."

His program music, focused on the program symphony or symphonic poem, is most influenced by Hector Berlioz, Richard Strauss and "follows in the footsteps of Ottorino Respighi" (Mark Greenfast, New Music Connoisseur). He has worked with orchestras in Orvieto, Palermo, Perugia, Florence, Rome, Danbury, Sofia, Brussels, Ghent, Worcester, Cairo, Brazil, Basel, Prague, Vienna, Quebec, San Jose, Philadelphia, Vancouver, London, and New York. He has written works for the Orchestra Sinfonica Siciliana, Chamber Orchestra of New York, Teatro Massimo Opera Orchestra, San Diego Symphony, Chamber Orchestra of Philadelphia, The Morgan Library & Museum, and others. He has taught at Loyola School (New York City) and Adelphi University.

In 2007, Di Vittorio gained considerable attention with the Chamber Orchestra of New York, when he was invited by Elsa and Gloria Pizzoli (Respighi's great nieces) and Potito Pedarra (Respighi archive curator and cataloger) to edit, orchestrate and complete several early works of Respighi including the first Violin Concerto (of 1903), for publication with Edizioni Panastudio and Casa Ricordi in Italy. He premiered and then recorded three of these critical editions, together with his own Overtura Respighiana and first two program symphonies, in 2010 with the Chamber Orchestra of New York for Naxos Records. These first recordings were released in 2011.

Other notable restorations of historical interest include: Respighi's 1908 orchestration of Claudio Monteverdi's Lamento di Arianna (from the lost opera Arianna, 1608) edited in 2012, and Di Vittorio's completion of Respighi's orchestration of the Tre Liriche (Three Art Songs, 1913) edited for its centennial anniversary in 2013. In 2019, Di Vittorio completed the first printed edition of Respighi's second Violin Concerto "all'Antica". With Chamber Orchestra of New York, Di Vittorio went on to record the Violin Concerto "all'Antica" in 2019 alongside Respighi's Ancient Airs and Dances Suites and the mezzo songs in 2021, again, for Naxos Records.  

In November 2012, Di Vittorio gave the world premiere of his Sinfonia No. 3 "Templi di Sicilia" in his debut with the Orchestra Sinfonica Siciliana at the Teatro Politeama in Palermo." RAI featured him in an interview during the evening news. The program also included the European Premieres of Di Vittorio's Overtura Respighiana and Respighi's First Concerto per Violino (in La Maggiore). Both Giornale di Sicilia and La Repubblica published reviews about the concerts, acclaiming his neo-classical works." Soon after, Di Vittorio was awarded the Medal of Palermo from Mayor Leoluca Orlando who "recognized the great importance of Di Vittorio's work as a promoter of the city of Palermo around the world."

The world premieres of Di Vittorio's Fanfara del Mare "Su un Tema di Monteverdi" with the San Diego Symphony, commissioned for the centennial of Balboa Park and its Organ Pavilion at Copley Symphony Hall in 2015, and Venere e Adone for the Chamber Orchestra of Philadelphia in 2016 received critical acclaim.

During the summer of 2016, Salvatore Di Vittorio reached a significant milestone when he became the first native Italian composer to be invited to donate an autograph manuscript of his work to The Morgan Library & Museum music archive. La Villa d'Este a Tivoli was composed in 2015 for the Morgan on the occasion of its exhibition City of the Soul: Rome and the Romantics, June 2016.

In late 2018, Di Vittorio completed his Sinfonia N. 4 "Metamorfosi" (Metamorphoses), based on Ovid's Metamorphoses and three Italian paintings related to the story. In June 2021, Naxos released a second album of Di Vittorio's music that includes several world premiere recordings, including the new fourth symphony.

Decca Classics released two recordings in 2021 involving Di Vittorio's published restorations of Respighi's works. The London Philharmonic released a recording of Nebbie from Tre Liriche under conductor Renato Balsadonna and tenor Freddie de Tommaso, and Teatro Alla Scala Opera Orchestra recorded Aria for strings under conductor Riccardo Chailly. 

Di Vittorio is published by Panastudio, under exclusive distributor Casa Ricordi in Italy.

He resides with his family in New York and Palermo.

Works
List of Compositions

Orchestral
Larchmont Harbor, per piccola orchestra (2021)
Arie per Enea, per mezzosoprano e orchestra (2020)
Suite Verdiana, per orchestra (2020)
Ballo delle Muse, per violino e orchestra (2020)
Sinfonia No. 4 Metamorfosi", per orchestra (2019)
Sarabanda Antica, per orchestra da camera (2018)
Venere, per flauto, arpa e archi (2017)
Preludio Sentimentale, per orchestra d'archi (2017)
Canto Per la Nativita', per piccola orchestra (2016)
Ode Corelliana", per piccola orchestra (2016)
La Villa d'Este a Tivoli, per piccola orchestra (2015)
Fanfara del Mare (Sea Fanfare) "Su un Tema di Monteverdi", per orchestra (2015)
Venere e Adone, per piccola orchestra (2014)
Overtura Palermo, per orchestra (2013)
Il Tallone di Achille (Achilles' Heel), per piccola orchestra (2010, Completed 2013)
Stabat Mater Speciosa, Per la Nativita', per coro (a cinque) e piccola orchestra (2012)
Sinfonia No. 3 "Templi di Sicilia", per orchestra (2011)
Concerto per Violino (in La Maggiore) [Respighi - Di Vittorio] (1903/2009)
Overtura Respighiana, per orchestra (Based on music of Ottorino Respighi and Gioacchino Rossini) (2008)
San Michele Arcangelo, per baritono, coro e orchestra da camera (Prologue from opera "Fausto") (2005)
Romanza dal "Romeo e Giulietta", per orchestra da camera (2004)
Sinfonia No. 2 "Lost Innocence", per orchestra (1997/Revised 2000)
Sinfonia No. 1 "Isolation", per orchestra d'archi (1994/Revised 1999)
Elegy, per orchestra (Movement IV from Sinfonia No. 2) (1996)
Preludio, per orchestra d'archi (Movement I from Sinfonia No. 1) (1994)

Transcriptions and revisions of orchestral music of Ottorino Respighi
Berceuse per archi (1902/Edited 2021)
Violin Concerto "all'Antica" (1908/Edited 2019)
Tre Liriche, per mezzo-sorprano e orchestra (1913/Orchestration Completed 2013) [Version for soprano (or tenore) and orchestra completed and published in 2020.]
Lamento di Arianna, per mezzosoprano e orchestra (1908/Edited 2012) [Monteverdi - Respighi]
Serenata, per piccola orchestra (1904/Edited 2012)
Suite in Sol Maggiore, per archi ed organo (1905/Edited 2011)
Suite per archi (1902/Revised 2010)
Aria per archi (1901/Transcribed 2010)
Concerto per Violino (in La Maggiore) (1903/Completed 2009)[Respighi - Di Vittorio]

Other Transcriptions and Orchestrations
We Have All the Time in the World, per orchestra d'archi (2020) (John Barry (composer) - orchestration by Di Vittorio)
Orfeo, Toccata e Ritornello, per orchestra da camera (2017) (Monteverdi - orchestration by Di Vittorio)
Clair de Lune, per piccola orchestra (2016) (Debussy - orchestration by Di Vittorio)
O Mio Babbino Caro, per piccola orchestra (2016) (Puccini - orchestration by Di Vittorio)

Opera
"Fausto", Opera in due atti, per sei solisti, coro e orchestra da camera (Based on Dr. Faustus by Thomas Mann; Libretto in Italian: To be completed)
Romeo e Giulietta, Opera in due atti, per sei solisti, coro e orchestra (Based on Romeo and Juliet by William Shakespeare; Libretto in Italian: 2003)

Choral and vocal
Stabat Mater Speciosa, Per la Nativita', per coro (a cinque) e piccola orchestra (2012)San Michele Arcangelo, per baritono, coro e orchestra da camera (Prologue from opera "Fausto") (2005)Ave Maria, per coro femminile (1995/Revised 1998)Magnificat, per coro misto (1995)

ChamberCastelli, per piccolo ensemble (2014)Sonata No. 2 "Reflections on a Nursery rhyme", per pianoforte (1996)Sonata No. 1, per clarinetto'' (1995/Revised 1998)

References

External links
 Official website of Salvatore Di Vittorio
 Chamber Orchestra of New York
 Catalog of publisher Casa Ricordi

1967 births
Living people
Musicians from Palermo
Italian classical composers
Italian male classical composers
Composers from Sicily
20th-century classical composers
21st-century classical composers
Italian classical musicians
Italian male conductors (music)
Manhattan School of Music alumni
Columbia University alumni
20th-century Italian composers
21st-century Italian composers
20th-century Italian conductors (music)
21st-century Italian conductors (music)
20th-century Italian male musicians
21st-century Italian male musicians